E.Leclerc (informally simply Leclerc) is a French cooperative society and hypermarket chain, headquartered in Ivry-sur-Seine. 
E.Leclerc was established on 1 January 1948 by Édouard Leclerc in Brittany. E.Leclerc currently has more than 720 locations in France and 85 stores outside of the country, as of 2019. The chain enables semi-independent stores to operate under the Leclerc brand.

Own brand ranges come under the Marque Repère and Eco+ banners, as well as a MVNO called Réglo Mobile which uses the mobile network of SFR. Some larger hypermarkets have a separate entertainment/multimedia section, under the name of Espace Culturel.
E.Leclerc operates numerous stores and services around France, some near and in cities and towns while most of them are located just outside or in the hypermarkets and shopping centres.
 L'auto  (Car Garage)
 Brico (DIY store)
 Le Prou Construction (Residential and commercial construction) 
 Espace Culturel (Multimedia store/DVD store)
 Jardin (Garden Centre)
 Location (A Quick Car rental Service)
 Manège à Bijoux (Jewelry Kiosk)
 Optique (Opticians)  
 Parapharmacie (Pharmacy, Chemist store)
 Sport (Sports shop)
 Station-Service (Petrol/Gas Station)
 UNE HEURE POUR SOI (Perfume store)
 Bornes électriques (Electrical store)
 Animalerie (Pet Shop)
 Jouets (Game store mainly aimed at kids)
 Occasion (Second-hand products)

History of Leclerc 
In 1949, Édouard Leclerc opened his first store, in Landerneau, in Brittany, on the same model as the self-service grocery store invented by Félix Potin in 1844. Subsequently, in the 1950s, a new brand called E.Leclerc clothing opens its doors and the sixtieth E.Leclerc center also opens its doors in Issy-les-Moulineaux by Jean-Pierre Le Roch. In 1962, the E.Leclerc Centers Purchasing Group (GALEC) was created. In 1964, the Landerneau store expanded, becoming the first E.Leclerc hypermarket. From 1969, 75 centers withdrew to form the future Intermarché. Over the years, several spaces were founded such as Le Manège à Bijoux in 1986, E.Leclerc Voyages in 1987, L'auto E.Leclerc in 1988 and the Parapharmacy E.Leclerc in 1988 after the end of the pharmacists' monopoly on sales. parapharmacy products. In 1973, Édouard Leclerc invented the concept of wine fairs, which he launched in his supermarkets.    

In 1991, E.Leclerc launched a first-price range and created the Tissaia brand, the first E.Leclerc clothing brand. In 1992, he opened his first store in Pamplona in Spain and began to expand in Europe. The first E.Leclerc Cultural Center opened its doors in 1994. Leclerc opened its first store in Warsaw, Poland. E.Leclerc stopped distributing disposable plastic bags in 1996. The Repère brand was launched for the first time in 1997 by the brand. The following year, opening of the first E.Leclerc perfumery “One hour for oneself”. During 1998, E.Leclerc and the Système U group joined forces and created a common purchasing center called “Lucie”. The agreement will last only three years. Only the fuel purchase activity survived and the entity was renamed “Synergie” without publicity.

Leclerc stores 
As of 2019, there were 721 E.Leclerc stores in France, along with 690 DRIVE stores. There were 83 stores outside of France. Leclerc stores are also present in Poland, Portugal, Spain, Réunion, Andorra, Slovenia and Wallis and Futuna.

References

External links 

Official site

Hypermarkets of France
Retail companies established in 1948
French companies established in 1948
French brands